Tattoos World Tour was a world tour by R&B and pop singer Jason Derulo. It was his second headlining world tour and his first headlining tour since he broke a vertebra in January 2012 while rehearsing for his Future History World Tour, leading to its cancellation. The tour made stops in most parts of Europe and Australia, with Conor Maynard as his opening act. Due to popular demand after the March 20 and March 22, 2014, shows in England had sold out, two more dates were added to the March show line-up, on March 25 and March 27, 2014, in Newcastle at the O2 Academy auditorium and in Leeds at the Leeds Academy, with another show added during the second leg of the tour in Rabat, Morocco in Africa.

Background 
On September 30, 2013 during a promotional visit in Australia for his third studio album Tattoos Derulo announced that he would be returning to Australia in 2014 for a national tour starting in April and ending in May. It will be his first headlining tour since he broke a vertebra in January 2012 while rehearsing for his Future History World tour, leading to its cancellation. "I had to cancel my last tour, so this one will be something special. I’m already planning it" Derulo states when talking about his preparation for the tour.

Pre-sale tickets for the Australian leg of the tour went on sale on Tuesday, October 8. Regular tickets went on sale Friday, October 11, 2013 On October 8, 2013, Derulo announced additional dates in the UK, Ireland and other parts of Europe for March 2014. The tickets went on sale on October 11. On November 1, 2013, Derulo announced through his official Twitter account that Conor Maynard would be the supporting act for the European leg of the tour. Due to popular demand after the March 20 and March 22, 2014 shows in England had sold out, two more dates were added to the March show line-up. On March 25 and March 27, 2014 in Newcastle at the O2 Academy Newcastle arena and in Leeds at the Leeds Academy, with another show added during the second leg of the tour in Rabat, Morocco in Africa. More dates to be announced.

Opening acts 
Conor Maynard 
Ricki-Lee Coulter 
Molly Sandén 
Titanium

Setlist 
The following setlist was obtained from the concert on March 20, 2014, held at the O2 Apollo Manchester in Manchester, England. It does not represent all concerts for the duration of the tour.
 "In My Head"
 "Whatcha Say"
 "Stupid Love"
 "Ridin' Solo"
 "Marry Me"
 "The Other Side"
 "It Girl"
 "Breathing"
 "Fight For You"
 "With The Lights On"
 "Royals"
 "Vertigo"
 "Side FX"
 "Don't Wanna Go Home"
 "The Other Side" 
 "Talk Dirty"
Encore
 "Wiggle"
 "Trumpets"

Tour dates

References

2014 concert tours
Jason Derulo